Gustav Bergmann (May 4, 1906 – April 21, 1987) was an Austrian-born American philosopher. He studied at the University of Vienna and was a member of the Vienna Circle. Bergmann was influenced by the philosophers Moritz Schlick, Friedrich Waismann, and Rudolf Carnap who were members of the Circle. In the United States, he was a professor of philosophy and psychology at the University of Iowa.

Biography 
Bergmann was born in Vienna, Austria-Hungary. He earned his Ph.D. in mathematics at the University of Vienna in 1928. His dissertation, directed by Walther Mayer, was titled Zwei Beiträge zur mehrdimensionalen Differentialgeometrie. While studying for his doctorate, he was invited to join the Vienna Circle, a group of philosophers, mathematicians, scientists, and others committed to a scientific worldview under the name of logical positivism. In 1930–31, he worked with Albert Einstein in Berlin. Unable as a Jew to find academic employment, Bergmann obtained a J.D. degree from the University of Vienna in 1935, and practiced corporate law until he and his family fled to the United States in 1938. Settling at the University of Iowa in Iowa City in 1939, Bergmann eventually became professor of both philosophy and psychology.

He died in Iowa City.

Bibliography 
 The Metaphysics of Logical Positivism. New York: Longmans, Green & Co. 1954. (Second edition: Madison, University of Wisconsin Press, 1967.)
 Philosophy of Science. Madison: University of Wisconsin Press 1957.
 Meaning and Existence. Madison: University of Wisconsin Press 1959.
 Logic and Reality. Madison: University of Wisconsin Press 1964.
 Realism: A Critique of Brentano and Meinong. Madison: University of Wisconsin Press 1967.
 New Foundations of Ontology. Madison: University of Wisconsin Press 1992. Edited by William Heald.
 Collected Works. Vol I. II. Frankfurt am Main: Ontos Verlag 2003.

See also 
 American philosophy
 List of American philosophers

References

References 
  Ontology and Analysis: Essays and Recollections about Gustav Bergmann, edited by Laird Addis, Greg Jesson, and Erwin Tegtmeier, Frankfurt: Ontos Verlag, 2007.
  Fostering the Ontological Turn: Gustav Bergmann (1906–1987), edited by Rosaria Egidi and Guido Bonino, Frankfurt: Ontos Verlag, 2008.
  Gustav Bergmann: Phenomenological Realism and Dialectical Ontology, edited by Bruno Langlet and Jean-Maurice Monnoyer, Frankfurt: Ontos Verlag, 2009.
 The Ontological Turn: Studies in the Philosophy of Gustav Bergmann, edited by Moltke Gram and Elmer Klemke, Iowa City: University of Iowa Press, 1974.
  The Positivist and the Ontologist: Bergmann, Carnap, and Logical Realism, by Herbert Hochberg, Amsterdam: Rodopi, 2001.

External links 
 Bergmann archives
 Bergmann pictures, biography, bibliography
 Heald on Bergmann
 Hochberg on Bergmann
 Theory and History of Ontology on Bergmann
 Philosophy Pages on Bergmann

1906 births
1987 deaths
20th-century American lawyers
20th-century American philosophers
20th-century American male writers
20th-century American non-fiction writers
20th-century Austrian lawyers

American male non-fiction writers
Jewish emigrants from Austria to the United States after the Anschluss
Analytic philosophers
Austrian Jews
Austrian male writers
Austrian philosophers
Jewish American academics
Jewish philosophers
Linguistic turn
Ontologists
Metaphysicians
Philosophers from Iowa
Philosophers of science
University of Iowa faculty
University of Vienna alumni
Vienna Circle
Writers from Vienna